The Dr. Erich Salomon Award (Dr.-Erich-Salomon-Preis), dedicated to Erich Salomon, is a lifetime achievement award for photojournalists given by the German Society for Photography (Deutsche Gesellschaft für Photographie, DGPh).

Winners

1971 Stern magazine
1972 du magazine
1973 Avenue magazine
1974 Epoca magazine
1975 Personenbeschreibung (ZDF series)
1976 Zeitmagazin
1977  magazine
1978 National Geographic magazine
1979 
1980 Geo magazine
1981 Picture service of Deutsche Presse-Agentur (DPA)
1982 World Press Photo
1983 Lotte Jacobi - 
1984 Frankfurter Allgemeine Magazin
1985 Robert Frank
1986 Peter Magubane
1987 
1988 Sebastião Salgado
1989 Barbara Klemm
1990 Cristina García Rodero
1991 Robert Lebeck
1992/1993 Don McCullin
1994 Mary Ellen Mark
1995 Gilles Peress
1996 
1997 Peter Hunter (né Otto Salomon, son of Dr. Erich Salomon)
1998 René Burri
1999 Eva Besnyö
2000 Arno Fischer
2001 Herlinde Koelbl
2002 Reporters sans frontières
2003 John G. Morris
2004 Will McBride
2005 Horst Faas
2006 Martin Parr
2007 Letizia Battaglia
2008 Anders Petersen
2009 Sylvia Plachy
2010 Michael von Graffenried
2011 Heidi and Hans-Jürgen Koch
2012 Peter Bialobrzeski
2013 Paolo Pellegrin
2014 Gerd Ludwig
2015 Josef Koudelka
2016: Rolf Nobel
2017: Antanas Sutkus
2019: Stephanie Sinclair
2020: Chris Killip

References

Awards established in 1971
German awards
Photography awards
Lifetime achievement awards
Photography in Germany